Mariana Ivette Ezeta Salcedo (born 10 September 1969) is a Mexican politician from the Ecologist Green Party of Mexico. From 2009 to 2010 she served as Deputy of the LXI Legislature of the Mexican Congress representing Querétaro.

References

1969 births
Living people
People from Querétaro
Women members of the Chamber of Deputies (Mexico)
Ecologist Green Party of Mexico politicians
21st-century Mexican politicians
21st-century Mexican women politicians
Deputies of the LXI Legislature of Mexico
Members of the Chamber of Deputies (Mexico) for Querétaro